Jacek Zygmunt Kościelniak (born 9 October 1963 in Dąbrowa Górnicza) is a Polish politician. He was elected to the Sejm on 25 September 2005, getting 3,765 votes in 32 Sosnowiec district as a candidate from the Law and Justice list.

See also
Members of Polish Sejm 2005-2007

External links
Jacek Kościelniak - parliamentary page - includes declarations of interest, voting record, and transcripts of speeches.

1963 births
Living people
People from Dąbrowa Górnicza
Members of the Polish Sejm 2005–2007
Law and Justice politicians